27 Lyncis is a single star in the northern constellation of Lynx. It is visible to the naked eye as a faint, white-hued star with an apparent visual magnitude of 4.78. This object is located around 250 light years away from the Sun, as determine from parallax measurements. It is moving further from the Sun with a heliocentric radial velocity of +11 km/s.

This is an ordinary A-type main-sequence star with a stellar classification of A2 V, which indicates it is generating energy through hydrogen fusion at its core. It is 157 million years old and is spinning with a projected rotational velocity of 183. The star has 2.24 times the mass of the Sun and is radiating 65 times the Sun's luminosity from its photosphere at an effective temperature of 10,014 K. X-ray emission is being detected near these coordinates, which may be coming from an undetected companion or a background source.

References 

A-type main-sequence stars
Lynx (constellation)
Durchmusterung objects
Lyncis, 27
067006
039847
3173